Adela Reta (9 July 1921– 3 April 2001) was a Uruguayan lawyer, jurist and politician who served as Minister of Education and Culture from 1985 to 1990 under President Julio María Sanguinetti.

Biography 

In 1983-1984 she took part in the Committee on Human Rights, denouncing atrocities during the civic-military dictatorship, together with other notable people like Horacio Terra Gallinal, Rodolfo Canabal, Luis Hierro Gambardella, Manuel Flores Mora, Eduardo Jaurena, Francisco Ottonelli, and Alberto Zumarán.

A member of the Colorado Party, she was Minister of Education and Culture during the first presidential term of Julio María Sanguinetti. She spent her last years as Director of SODRE.

References

1921 births
2001 deaths
Uruguayan women lawyers
Uruguayan women jurists
Criminal defense lawyers
Scholars of criminal law
Colorado Party (Uruguay) politicians
Women government ministers of Uruguay
Education and Culture Ministers of Uruguay
20th-century women lawyers